Curtis Arnoux Peters, Jr. (January 8, 1904 – February 22, 1968), known professionally as Peter Arno, was an American cartoonist.  He contributed cartoons and 101 covers to The New Yorker from 1925, the magazine's first year, until 1968, the year of his death. In 2015, New Yorker contributor Roger Angell described him as "the magazine's first genius".

Biography
Arno was born on January 8, 1904, in New York City.  His father was Curtis Arnoux Peters, a New York State Supreme Court judge. He was educated at the Hotchkiss School and Yale University, where he contributed illustrations, covers and cartoons to The Yale Record, the campus humor magazine, as "Peters".  He also formed a jazz band called the Yale Collegians, in which he played piano, banjo, and accordion. Arno's infatuation with show business later had him designing, writing, and/or producing for four Broadway shows, and appearing with fellow cartoonists
in the film Artists and Models.

After one year at Yale he moved home to Manhattan and worked as an illustrator for a silent film company (Chadwick Films) before joining the staff of the fledgling magazine The New Yorker. The iconic cartoons and covers he created there, from 1925 through 1968, helped establish the magazine's reputation for sophisticated humor and fine illustration.  His work often depicted a cross-section of New York City society, though he was also inspired by situations he encountered during his travels.  Arno drew his cartoons in batches, usually over a two-day period each week.  Arno often worked with gag writers, one of whom coined the popular expression "back to the drawing board" in a famous March 1, 1941 cartoon.

In 1927 he married Lois Long, a popular New Yorker columnist and fashion editor who wrote under the pseudonym "Lipstick." Their one daughter, Patricia, was born September 18, 1928, and the couple divorced in 1930.  Arno later married debutante Mary Livingston Lansing in August 1935; they divorced in July 1939.

After his second divorce, Arno moved to a farm near Harrison, New York, where he lived in seclusion, enjoying music, guns, and sports cars.

Arno died of emphysema on February 22, 1968, at the age of 64. He is buried at Kensico Cemetery in Valhalla, New York.

A biography, Peter Arno: The Mad Mad World of The New Yorker's Greatest Cartoonist by New Yorker cartoonist, Michael Maslin was published in April 2016 by Regan Arts.

Bibliography
 Whoops, Dearie!. New York: Simon & Schuster, 1927. (ghostwritten by Philip Wylie)
 Parade. New York: H. Liveright, 1929.
 Hullabaloo. New York: H. Liveright, 1930.
 Circus. New York: H. Liveright, 1931.
 Favorites. New York: Blue Ribbon Books, 1932.
 For Members Only. New York: Simon & Schuster, 1935.
 Cartoon Revue. New York: Simon & Schuster, 1941.
 Man in the Shower. New York: Simon & Schuster, 1944.
 Sizzling Platter. New York: Simon & Schuster, 1949.
 Ladies and Gentlemen. New York: Simon & Schuster, 1951.
 Hell of a Way to Run a Railroad. New York: Simon & Schuster, 1956.
 Lady in the Shower. New York: Simon & Schuster, 1967.
 Peter Arno. New York: Dodd, Mead, 1979.

References

External links
 
 
 
 Peter Arno on The New Yorker's Cartoon Bank
 Peter Arno, An Appreciation, Searching for Laugh
Billy Ireland Cartoon Library & Museum Art Database

1904 births
1968 deaths
American cartoonists
The New Yorker cartoonists
The Yale Record alumni
Burials at Kensico Cemetery
Artists from New York City
Hotchkiss School alumni